The Birmingham Senior Cup is a football competition for Birmingham County FA club teams, organised by the Birmingham County Football Association. It began in 1876 and is the oldest county cup competition still active.

The Birmingham Senior Cup is a regional cup contest, which has featured all of the West Midlands' big clubs, Aston Villa, Birmingham City, Burton Albion, Coventry City, Port Vale, Stoke City,  West Bromwich Albion, Walsall and Wolverhampton Wanderers. However, in recent years many of region's higher division clubs have tended to treat the cup as a reserve or youth team competition, giving non-league sides a greater chance of success, while the competition's most successful team, Aston Villa, did not compete at all for several years, before returning for the 2018-19 competition.  In the 2016–17 season, Leamington became the first team to win the cup in a penalty shootout, defeating Wolverhampton Wanderers.

Past finals

Records
Record number of wins
 Aston Villa (19)
Most consecutive wins
 Aston Villa (4): 1882, 1883, 1884, 1885 & 1888, 1889, 1890, 1891
Record number of final appearances
 Aston Villa (28)
Highest scoring finals
 1905 Small Heath 7–2 West Bromwich Albion
 1967 Kidderminster Harriers 6–3 Nuneaton Borough
 1969 Tamworth 6–3 Bilston Town

Five or more wins by club

Aston Villa: 19 (9 x runners up)
Birmingham City: 13 (1 as Small Heath) (4)
Nuneaton Borough: 9 (7)
Leamington: 8 (6)
Wolverhampton Wanderers: 7 (10)
West Bromwich Albion: 7 (8)
Kidderminster Harriers: 7 (2)
Redditch United: 5 (4)

References

County Cup competitions
Recurring sporting events established in 1876
Football in the West Midlands (county)
Sport in Birmingham, West Midlands